Nizhny Allaguvat (Tübänge Allağıwat) is a rural locality (a village) and the administrative centre of Allaguvatsky Selsoviet, Sterlibashevsky District, Bashkortostan, Russia. The population was 295 as of 2010. There are 4 streets.

Geography 
Nizhny Allaguvat is located 36 km southeast of Sterlibashevo (the district's administrative centre) by road. Verkhny Allaguvat is the nearest rural locality.

References 

Rural localities in Sterlibashevsky District